The High Commissioner of Malaysia to the Republic of India is the head of Malaysia's diplomatic mission to India. The position has the rank and status of an Ambassador Extraordinary and Plenipotentiary and is based in the High Commission of Malaysia, New Delhi. This ambassador also functed as non-resident ambassador to Afghanistan and Bhutan.

List of heads of mission

See also
 India–Malaysia relations

References 

High Commissioners of Malaysia to India
India
Malaysia